Woods Cross station is a FrontRunner commuter rail station in Woods Cross, Utah. It is operated by the Utah Transit Authority (UTA).

Description 
The station is located at 750 South 800 West on approximately 13.5 acres of land  and is easily accessed from I-15 by way of the 500 South (SR-68) interchange. (From the I-15/500 S interchange, turn south onto 700 West, which after a few blocks curves right, very briefly becoming 700 South, and then curves left and becomes 800 West.) Unlike nearly all other stations served by the FrontRunner, the station is located in a fairly residential area. However, major commercial and retail areas are located just across I-15 to the east in Bountiful and there is an oil refinery located to the northwest of the station on the far side of the tracks and 500 South.

The station has two Park and Ride lots with total of about free 230 parking spaces available. The primary parking lot is situated between the station platform and 800 West, while the secondary parking lot is very short walk north on the north side of 700 South. The Station is located within the Quiet Zone, so trains do not routinely sound their horns when approaching public crossings within this corridor. The station opened for service on April 26, 2008, and is operated by the Utah Transit Authority.

History 
The inaugural FrontRunner train departed the station southbound at 11:30 am on April 26, 2008.

On December 1, 2011, service was to the station was suspended for most of the day due to severe damage cause by a major wind storm that passed through Davis County. Although the Woods Cross station was not directly affected, damage to the Farmington Station was so extensive that a "bus bridge" was used to ferry passengers between the Layton and Salt Lake Central stations while repairs were made. Although full service resumed by 3:00 pm, repairs to the station took several more days to complete.

Woods Cross was formerly the first FrontRunner station north of Salt Lake Central. However, at the same time that FrontRunner South opened on December 10, 2012, a new infill station (North Temple Bridge/Guadalupe) also opened for service just north of Salt Lake Central.

Notes

References

External links

Railway stations in the United States opened in 2008
UTA FrontRunner stations
Transportation in Davis County, Utah
2008 establishments in Utah
Railway stations in Davis County, Utah